The 2017–18 Argentine Torneo Federal A, was the 5th season of the third tier of the Argentine football league system. The tournament is reserved for teams indirectly affiliated to the Asociación del Fútbol Argentino (AFA), while teams affiliated to AFA  have to play the Primera B Metropolitana, which is the other third tier competition. The champion was promoted to Primera B Nacional. 39 teams are competing in the league, 31 returning from the 2016–17 season, 4 teams that were relegated from Primera B Nacional and 4 teams promoted from Federal B. The regular season began on September 17, 2017 and ended in May 2018.

Format

First stage
The teams were divided into three zones with ten teams and one zone with nine teams (a total of 39 teams) in each zone and it was played in a round-robin tournament whereby each team played each one of the other teams two times. The teams placed 1º to 4º from each zone qualified for the Second Stage. The remaining twenty three teams qualify for the Revalida Stage.

Championship stages

Second stage
The teams were divided into two zones with eight teams each and it was played in a round-robin tournament whereby each team played each one of the other teams one time. The teams placed 1º and 2º and the best 3º team from the two zones qualified for the Third Stage or Pentagonal Final. The remaining team placed 3º qualify for the Third Phase of the Revalida Stage. The other ten teams qualify for the Second Phase of the Revalida Stage.

Third stage
The five teams that qualified for the third stage or Pentagonal Final play in a round-robin tournament whereby each team played each one of the other teams one time. The winner was declared champion and automatically promoted to the Primera B Nacional. The other four teams qualify for the Fourth Phase of the Revalida Stage.

Revalida Stages
The Revalida Stage is divided in several phases: First, the twenty three teams that did not qualify for the Championship Stages were divided into the same four zones of the First Stage and it was played in a round-robin tournament whereby each team played each one of the other teams two times. The team placed 1º of each zone qualified for the Second Phase. The second phase is played between the four teams that qualified from the First Phase and the ten teams that qualified from the Second Stage of the Championship Stage. The seven winners qualify for the Third Phase.

The Third Phase is played between the seven teams that qualified from the Second Phase and the team that qualified from the Second Stage of the Championship Stage. The four winners qualify for the Fourth Phase.

The Fourth Phase is played between the four teams that qualified from the Third Phase and the four teams that qualified from the Third Stage of the Championship Stage. The four winners qualify for the Fifth Phase. The Fifth and Sixth Phase is played between the remaining teams and aims to get the Second promotion to the Primera B Nacional.

Relegation
After the First Phase of the Revalida Stage a table was drawn up with the average of points obtained in the First Stage and the First Phase of the Revalida Stage. It is determined by dividing the points by the number of games played and the bottom team of each four zones was relegated to the Torneo Federal B. Also, another table was drawn up with the remaining teams that played the Revalida Stage and the bottom four teams were relegated to the Torneo Federal B. Giving a total of eight teams relegated.

Club information

Zone A

1 Play their home games at Estadio José María Minella.

Zone B

Zone C

Zone D

1 Play their home games at Estadio José Antonio Romero Feris.

First stage

Zone A

Results

Zone B

Results

Zone C

Results

Zone D

Results

Championship stages

Second stage

Zone A

Results

Zone B

Results

Ranking of third-placed teams

Third stage

Results

Reválida Stage

First phase

Zone A

Results

Zone B

Results

Zone C

Results

Zone D

Results

Second phase

|-

|-

|-

|-

|-

|-

|-

Third phase

|-

|-

|-

|-

Fourth to Sixth phase

Fourth phase

|-

|-

|-

|-

Fifth phase

|-

|-

Sixth phase

|-

Relegation

Zone A

Zone B

Zone C

Zone D

General table

Season statistics

Top scorers

See also
 2017–18 Primera B Nacional
 2017–18 Copa Argentina

References

External links
 Sitio Oficial de AFA   
 Ascenso del Interior  
 Solo Ascenso  
 Mundo Ascenso  
 Promiedos  

Torneo Federal A seasons
3